Piotr Morawski (27 December 1976 – 8 April 2009) was a Polish mountaineer. He was best known for making the first successful winter ascent together with Simone Moro of Shishapangma on 14 January 2005. Morawski died aged 32 during an international Dhaulagiri/Manaslu expedition in Nepal. He fell into a crevasse at an elevation of 5500 m while acclimatizing.

Major expeditions

References
MountEverest.net Polish mountaineering timeline
piotrmorawski.com official website (in Polish)
 Tragedy on Himalaya - Piotr Morawski lost on Dhaulagiri.
 Piotr Morawski the famous Polish climber. /Version english and polish/
 web album mBank Annapurna West Face Expedition 2008

1976 births
2009 deaths
Mountaineering deaths
Polish mountain climbers
Sport deaths in Nepal
Place of birth missing